Lieutenant-Colonel Henry Philip Hunloke TD (27 December 1906 – 13 January 1978) was a British Conservative politician.

Early life
Hunloke was born in Marylebone, London, the only son of Philip Hunloke and the former Sylvia Heseltine. He had two siblings, Alberta Diana Hunloke (wife of Sir George Paynter) and Joan Cecil Hunloke (wife of banker Philip Fleming, uncle of Ian Fleming, the creator of James Bond).

His maternal grandfather was the painter and art collector John Postle Heseltine of Walhampton. His paternal grandparents were Capt. Philip Perceval and the former Ernestine Wellington Sidney (a daughter of Sophia Sidney, Baroness De L'Isle and Dudley, herself the eldest illegitimate daughter of William IV of the United Kingdom through his relationship with Dorothea Jordan).

Career
Hunloke was a keen amateur cricketer and played minor counties cricket for Wiltshire on eleven occasions from 1926 to 1928.

Hunloke was elected as a Conservative  Member of Parliament for West Derbyshire in 1938, resigning in 1944. He was awarded the  Territorial Decoration.

Personal life
On 28 November 1929, he married Lady Anne Cavendish at St Margaret's, Westminster. Lady Anne was the youngest daughter of Victor Cavendish, 9th Duke of Devonshire. Before their divorce in 1945 on the grounds of his adultery, they lived at Montagu Square, London, and had three children:

 Phillipa Victoria Hunloke (1930–2005), who married William Astor, 3rd Viscount Astor, a son of Waldorf Astor, 2nd Viscount Astor and Nancy Astor, Viscountess Astor.
 Timothy Henry Hunloke (b. 1932), an officer in the Grenadier Guards.
 Nicholas Victor Hunloke (b. 1939), married Lady Katherine Montagu, a daughter of Victor Montagu, 10th Earl of Sandwich.

After their divorce, his wife remarried to Christopher Holland-Martin MP, and, after his death, the 10th Earl of Sandwich (who was the father of their son's wife). He married again to Virginia Archer Clive, daughter of Percy Clive (a grandson of William Feilding, 7th Earl of Denbigh) and the former Alice Muriel Dallas, on 19 May 1945. They lived at St. Catherine's Lodge in Wokingham and Pendower House in Cornwall. They had two children before their divorce in 1972:

 Clare Hunloke (1947–1964), who died at age 17.
 Sarah Hunloke (b. 1949), who married Antonio Corrêa de Sá, son of José Corrêa de Sá, 2nd Viscount de São Luis.

He later made a third marriage, to Ruth Holdsworth, before he died in Marlborough, Wiltshire on 13 January 1978, aged 71.

References

External links 
 

1906 births
1978 deaths
Conservative Party (UK) MPs for English constituencies
Members of the Parliament of the United Kingdom for constituencies in Derbyshire
UK MPs 1935–1945
Coldstream Guards officers
Pages of Honour
English cricketers
Wiltshire cricketers